Events in the year 2020 in Malaysia.

Federal level 

 Yang di-Pertuan Agong: Al-Sultan Abdullah of Pahang  
 Raja Permaisuri Agong: Tunku Azizah of Pahang
 Deputy Yang di-Pertuan Agong: Sultan Nazrin Shah of Perak
 Prime Minister: 
Mahathir Mohamad (until 24 February; interim from 24 February to 1 March)
Muhyiddin Yassin (from 1 March)
 Deputy Prime Minister: Wan Azizah Wan Ismail (until 24 February)
 Chief Justice: Tengku Maimun Tuan Mat

State level 
  :
Sultan of Johor: Sultan Ibrahim Ismail
 Menteri Besar of Johor:
Sahruddin Jamal (until 27 February)
Hasni Mohammad (from 28 February)
  :
 Sultan of Kedah: Sultan Sallehuddin
 Menteri Besar of Kedah:
Mukhriz Mahathir (until 16 May)
Muhammad Sanusi Md Nor (from 17 May)
  :
 Sultan of Kelantan: Sultan Muhammad V 
 Menteri Besar of Kelantan: Ahmad Yaakob
  :
 Raja of Perlis: Tuanku Syed Sirajuddin
 Menteri Besar of Perlis: Azlan Man
  :
 Sultan of Perak: Sultan Nazrin Shah
 Menteri Besar of Perak: 
Ahmad Faizal Azumu (until 5 December)
Saarani Mohammad (from 10 December)
  :
 Sultan of Pahang: Sultan Abdullah Al Haj 
 Menteri Besar of Pahang: Wan Rosdy Wan Ismail
  :
 Sultan of Selangor: Sultan Sharafuddin Idris Shah
 Menteri Besar of Selangor: Amirudin Shari
  :
 Sultan of Terengganu: Sultan Mizan Zainal Abidin
 Menteri Besar of Terengganu: Ahmad Samsuri Mokhtar
  :
 Yang di-Pertuan Besar of Negeri Sembilan: Tuanku Muhriz
 Menteri Besar of Negeri Sembilan: Aminuddin Harun
  :
 Yang di-Pertua Negeri of Penang: Abdul Rahman Abbas 
 Chief Minister of Penang: Chow Kon Yeow
  :
 Yang di-Pertua Negeri of Malacca:
 Mohd Khalil Yaakob (until 4 June)
 Mohd Ali Rustam (from 4 June)
 Chief Minister of Malacca:
Adly Zahari (until 2 March)
Sulaiman Md Ali (from 9 March)
  :
 Yang di-Pertua Negeri of Sarawak: Abdul Taib Mahmud
 Chief Minister of Sarawak: Abang Johari Openg
  :
 Yang di-Pertua Negeri of Sabah: Juhar Mahiruddin
 Chief Minister of Sabah: 
Shafie Apdal (until 26 September)
Hajiji Noor (from 29 September)

Events

January
1 January – Smoking ban officially takes place after a year-long grace period last year.
1 January – Visit Malaysia Year 2020 officially begins.
3 January – Maszlee Malik resigns as Minister of Education.
7–12 January – 2020 Malaysia Badminton Masters.
8 January – The MACC releases nine phone audio recordings received about a week earlier, recorded between 5 January to 29 July 2016, totaling about 45 minutes, revealing former prime minister Najib Razak's attempts to cover up investigations into the 1MDB scandal, which MACC chief Latheefa Beebi Koya described as "shocking, as there are attempts at cover-ups and subversion of justice". One of the audio recordings featured a conversation between Najib and his wife Rosmah Mansor, who sounded upset at Najib's mishandling on the scandal. In another audio recording, Najib  was seeking help from United Arab Emirates Crown Prince Mohammed bin Zayed Al Nahyan to help clear Najib's stepson, Riza Aziz's involvement in the scandal.
8 January – Former prime minister Najib Razak is in for nearly a full year of court appearances, after the High Court fixed further hearing dates from February until October for his corruption trial involving 25 charges over the 1MDB scandal.
13 January – Japanese national badminton player, Kento Momota was injured in an accident early in the morning on his way to airport after competed at the 2020 Malaysia Masters when the van he was on hit the back of the lorry on Maju Expressway in which the driver was killed.
18 January – 2020 Kimanis by-election. It was won by Mohamad Alamin a Barisan Nasional candidate from component party United Malays National Organisation (UMNO), replacing original member of parliament Anifah Aman whose election result was disqualified.
20 January - The Thai Peace Dialogue Panel, led by General Wanlop Rugsanaoh, met with Barisan Revolusi Nasional representative Anas Abdulrahman in Kuala Lumpur, in what was described as "the first round of official peace dialogue" by BNR official Abdul Aziz Jabal.
25 January - COVID-19 pandemic in Malaysia
The Malaysian government confirmed the first cases related to the COVID-19 pandemic in Malaysia. The cases include three Chinese citizens from Singapore and subsequently quarantined at Sungai Buloh Hospital.

February
7–14 February – 2020 Tour de Langkawi.
21 February 
Prime Minister, Tun Dr Mahathir Mohamad says the Pakatan Harapan presidential council meeting has given him the full trust on when to step down as Prime Minister which was decided by the presidential council which they met till late Friday night. Pakatan Harapan chairman said that after chairing the presidential council meeting, adding that he will decide when to step down after the Apec Summit in November to give its post to Dato Seri Anwar Ibrahim.
PKR president Datuk Seri Anwar Ibrahim has urged his party members as well as Pakatan Harapan coalition members to respect the decision made by the Pakatan presidential council on Friday night. The Port Dickson MP said he personally will not allow any of his party members to attack or condemn the decision that Tun Dr Mahathir Mohamad has been given full discretion when to step down as prime minister, which will be after the Apec Summit in November.
22 February – Six-time Malaysian Super League champions Johor Darul Ta’zim (JDT) has officially moved into their new Sultan Ibrahim Stadium from Larkin Stadium, its previous venue. The new stadium was officiated by Johor Ruler Sultan Ibrahim Ibni Almarhum Sultan Iskandar on Saturday night.
23 February – 2020 Malaysian constitutional crisis: 
Several important political meetings are being held at various spots in Petaling Jaya, Selangor and Kuala Lumpur. At 9am, Parti Pribumi Bersatu Malaysia (Bersatu) leaders and MPs were gathered at their headquarters at Yayasan Selangor including Prime Minister and Bersatu chairman, Tun Dr Mahathir Mohamad and Home Minister Tan Sri Muhyiddin Yassin. At Petaling Jaya's Sheraton Hotel, a dozen ministers and MPs, aligned to Datuk Seri Mohamed Azmin Ali's faction in PKR, were holed up in a meeting too. At 3pm, UMNO was also holed supreme council meeting at PWTC, Kuala Lumpur.  
At 5:35pm, several vehicles carrying 6 party leaders included PPBM president Tan Sri Muhyiddin Yassin, PKR deputy president Datuk Seri Azmin Ali, UMNO president Datuk Seri Ahmad Zahid Hamidi, PAS president Datuk Seri Abdul Hadi Awang, Sabah Chief Minister Datuk Seri Shafie Apdal and Sarawak Chief Minister Datuk Patinggi Abang Johari Tun Openg were entering the Istana Negara to granted audience with Yang Di-Pertuan Agong following talk of a formation of a new government coalition. 
Meanwhile, at PKR president Datuk Seri Anwar Ibrahim's residence in Bukit Segambut Kuala Lumpur, PKR president Datuk Seri Anwar Ibrahim said that there were attempts to topple Pakatan Harapan by former comrades in Parti Pribumi Bersatu Malaysia and traitors from PKR to form a new coalition government. When he was giving a sermon to his supporters, he will wait for a formal announcement on the matter. PKR supporters are attending prayers and later shouts of Reformasi!, Hidup Anwar!, PM Lapan! and Lawan Tetap Lawan! at Sunday night.
Datuk Seri Anwar Ibrahim was also attended meeting with DAP and AMANAH leaders at undisclosed location late Sunday following the betrayal within Pakatan Harapan.
24 February – 2020 Malaysian constitutional crisis: 
At 9 am, PKR president Datuk Seri Anwar Ibrahim, Deputy Prime Minister Datin Seri Wan Azizah Wan Ismail and DAP secretary-general Lim Guan Eng went to Prime Minister's office to meet with Prime Minister, Tun Dr Mahathir Mohamad  over the possible realignment of the country's political landscape. Later, they leave Prime Minister's office after they informed that Prime Minister was not there.
Health minister and Amanah strategic director Datuk Seri Dr Dzulkefly Ahmad said that Pakatan Harapan is still the government of the day and its ministers will continue to perform their duties. Meanwhile, the party's vice president Datuk Mahfuz Omar said that Amanah was never approached to join any new coalition.
At 12pm, PKR president Datuk Seri Anwar Ibrahim, Deputy Prime Minister Datin Seri Wan Azizah Wan Ismail, DAP secretary-general Lim Guan Eng and AMANAH president Mohamad Sabu arrived at Prime Minister's residence to meet with Prime Minister, Tun Dr. Mahathir Mohamad at Seri Kembangan, Selangor over possible of new government coalition and they later left around 12:30 pm
At 1.15pm, Datuk Seri Anwar Ibrahim and his wife, Datin Seri Wan Azizah Wan Ismail arrived at PKR HQ in Petaling Jaya and he stated that he was very satisfied for meeting with Prime Minister. Meanwhile, at 1:20pm, Finance Minister, Lim Guan Eng also arrive at DAP HQ in Kuala Lumpur and stated that his meeting with Prime Minister was very emotional.
At 2pm, PKR deputy president, Datuk Seri Azmin Ali and vice-president, Zuraida Kamaruddin were sacked from PKR for their betrayal against party principles and the effects of their actions causing instability in the Pakatan Harapan-led government. However, Azmin, Zuraida and 9 other MPs leave PKR to form an independent bloc in Parliament. 
At 2:20pm, Parti Pribumi Bersatu Malaysia (PPBM) officially leave Pakatan Harapan in support the leadership of Tun Dr Mahathir Mohamad as the prime minister, according to PPBM president, Tan Sri Muhyiddin Yassin.
At 2:25pm, Tun Dr Mahathir Mohamad announced his resignation as Prime Minister and Bersatu chairman, according to statement by Prime Minister Office (PMO) and Bersatu party. PMO also confirms that his resignation letter were already submitted to the King at 1pm.
At 2:30pm, PKR president, Datuk Seri Anwar Ibrahim and Deputy Prime Minister, Datin Seri Wan Azizah Wan Ismail arrived at Istana Negara to granted audience with Yang Di Pertuan Agong.
At 3:35pm, DAP, PKR, and AMANAH appealed to Tun Dr Mahathir to continue as Prime Minister despite his resignation.
At 5pm, Tun Dr Mahathir Mohamad was arrived at Istana Negara to meet with Yang Di-Pertuan Agong which he's called few hours after his resignation.
At 7:25pm, Yang di-Pertuan Agong has appointed Tun Dr Mahathir Mohamad as interim Prime Minister while waiting for a new premier to be appointed after the Agong accepted his resignation.
At 9pm, Bersatu supreme council has rejected Tun Dr Mahathir's resignation as Bersatu chairman after party special meeting between top party leaders and ex-PKR MPs for Datuk Seri Azmin Ali.
24 February – High Court judge Mohd Nazlan Ghazali has ruled that former prime minister Najib Razak's defence team cannot compel Malaysian Anti-Corruption Commission (MACC) investigating officer (IO) Mohd Nasharudin Amir into being interviewed prior to him testifying in court.
27 February – The High Court heard that businessman Jho Low had referred to former prime minister Najib Razak as his “boss” when dealing with sums of money totalling RM170 million that were transferred in and out of Putrajaya Perdana Bhd’s (PPB) subsidiaries from SRC International Sdn Bhd.

March
1 March – Muhyiddin Yassin officially sworn in as Prime Minister at 10:30 a.m. in Istana Negara.
3 March – The High Court dismissed the prosecution’s application to initiate contempt of court proceedings after former deputy prime minister Ahmad Zahid Hamidi made a public apology.
9 March – Prime Minister Muhyiddin Yassin formed his first cabinet, eight days after sworn in.
15 March – COVID-19 pandemic in Malaysia
The positive cases of coronavirus increased from 242 to 428, with the highest record increase number at that time. Most of the infects are related to a religious event at a mosque in Kuala Lumpur.
16 March – COVID-19 pandemic in Malaysia
Malaysia will impose a nationwide partial lockdown (known as the Movement Control Order) from 18 to 31 March to contain the coronavirus.
17 March – COVID-19 pandemic in Malaysia
First coronavirus related death case reported as two deaths recorded on that day.
18 March – Visit Malaysia 2020 has been cancelled due to coronavirus pandemic and movement control order.
25 March – Prime Minister Muhyiddin Yassin announces that movement control order be extended until April 14.

April
10 April – Prime Minister Muhyiddin Yassin announces that movement control order be extended for another two weeks until April 28.
23 April – Prime Minister Muhyiddin Yassin announces that movement control order be extended for another two weeks until May 12.

May
 8 May – Conditional Movement Control Order  extended  till 9 June 2020.

June
 2 June – The High Court has fixed July 27 for the case management of Najib Razak's money laundering case involving RM27 million of SRC International Sdn Bhd funds.
 7 June – Prime Minister Muhyiddin Yassin announces that the Recovery Movement Control Order is extended until 31 August 2020.
 23 June – Malaysia leads a 171 nation initiative at the United Nations to support U.N. Secretary General Antonio Guterras' appeal for a global ceasefire during the COVID-19 pandemic.

July
 22 July – The High Court has ruled in favour of the Inland Revenue of Board (IRB) in a summary judgment by allowing it to collect tax arrears from former prime minister Najib Razak for the amount of RM1.69 billion.
 28 July – the High Court convicted former prime minister Najib Razak on all seven counts of abuse of power, money laundering and criminal breach of trust, becoming the first Prime Minister of Malaysia to be convicted of corruption, and was sentenced to 12 years' imprisonment and fined RM210 million.
 29 July – Former prime minister Najib Razak has paid the additional RM1 million bail that he was required to post in his case involving RM42 million of former 1MDB unit SRC International Sdn Bhd’s funds.

August
 26 August – Former transport minister Loke Siew Fook said he had pictures of Umno leaders including former prime minister Najib Razak riding motorcycles without helmets. He said Najib had been wearing a songkok instead of a helmet while campaigning for the Slim by-election.
 28 August – Prime Minister Muhyiddin Yassin announces that the Recovery Movement Control Order is extended until 31 December 2020.

September
 14 September - Former prime minister Najib Razak is listed on the Malaysian Anti-Corruption Commission (MACC) online database of corruption offenders convicted locally. His name at the top of the first page of the MACC Corruption Offenders Database.
 24 September - High Court judge Mohd Nazlan Mohd Ghazali observed that former prime minister Najib Razak had expressed no remorse for his actions, and that his explanation that he had used a part of the RM42 million stolen from SRC International Sdn Bhd for charitable purposes simply could not be justified.
 26 September - 2020 Sabah state election
 Perikatan Nasional won the state election and formed government with Barisan Nasional and United Sabah Party and several allied independent politicians. The lack of strict standard operating procedures for the election and the return of voters and politicians from Sabah to Peninsular Malaysia had caused a significant influx of COVID-19 cases in Malaysia. Daily reported cases increased to three digit numbers in the following months. On 7 November, the Federal Government announced the implementation of a Conditional Movement Control Order in majority of states in the Peninsular and the state of Sabah due to the rising number of cases.

December
 2 December - Former prime minister Najib Razak has submitted 307 grounds in his petition of appeal on why he should be freed of the charges of misappropriating RM42 million in SRC International Sdn Bhd funds. Najib's lawyer Harvinderjit Singh confirmed that the petition was filed on Oct 19 and that it contained 307 grounds of appeal.

Deaths

January 
1 January – Peter Lo Sui Yin, former Chief Minister of Sabah (b. 1923).

February 
10 February – Abam Bocey, comedian (b. 1988).
18 February – Ashraf Sinclair, actor (b. 1979).
19 February – K.S. Maniam, novelist (b. 1942).

March 
18 March – Myanaliza Ruslee, singer (b. 1976).

April 
20 April – Farit Ismeth Emir, news anchor (b. 1954).

May 
31 May – Tan Aik Mong, badminton player (b. 1950).

August 

15 August – Yusof Kelana, director.
15 August – Abu Bakar Juah, actor (b. 1948).

September 

18 September – Dato' Awang anak Raweng, scout and war hero (b. 1929).
20 September – Tengku Abdul Aziz, Brother of Tengku Razaleigh Hamzah and Father of Tengku Temenggong Kelantan.
21 September – Tan Sri Wan Mokhtar, Former Chief Minister of Terengganu (b. 1932).

October 
2 October – Liew Vui Keong, MP of Batu Sapi
15 October – Tengku Merjan, Mother of Tengku Temenggong Kelantan.
16 October – Abdul Aziz Shamsuddin, Former Minister of Rural and Regional Development

November 
14 November – Zaleha Ismail, Former National Unity and Community Development Minister.
16 November – Hasbullah Osman, MP of Gerik
17 November – Manis Muka Mohd Darah, Member of Sabah State Legislative Assembly for Bugaya.

December 
15 December – Ungku Abdul Aziz, academician and economist.
17 December – Namat Abdullah, Former national footballer
18 December – Tun Rahah Tan Sri Mohamed Noah, widow of second Prime Minister Tun Abdul Razak Hussein (1970-1976) and mother of sixth Prime Minister, Najib Razak (2009-2018).
24 December – Mohamad Aziz, former Speaker of Johor State Legislative Assembly and former MP of Sri Gading.
26 December – Railey Jeffrey, former Deputy Minister of Works and Deputy Minister of Information.

References

 
2020s in Malaysia
Malaysia
Years of the 21st century in Malaysia
Malaysia